This is a list of electoral division results for the Australian 2001 federal election in the state of Victoria.

Overall results

Results by division

Aston

Ballarat

Batman

Bendigo

Bruce

Burke

Calwell

Casey

Chisholm

Corangamite

Corio

Deakin

Dunkley

Flinders

Gellibrand

Gippsland

Goldstein

Higgins

Holt

Hotham

Indi

Isaacs

Jagajaga

Kooyong

La Trobe

Lalor

Mallee

Maribyrnong

McEwen

McMillan

Melbourne

Melbourne Ports

Menzies

Murray

Scullin

Wannon

Wills

See also 

 Members of the Australian House of Representatives, 2001–2004

References 

Victoria 2001